Lance Nethery (born June 28, 1957) is a Canadian former professional ice hockey centre and coach, and current executive. He played 41 games in the National Hockey League with the New York Rangers and Edmonton Oilers during the 1980–81 and 1981–82 seasons. The rest of his career, which lasted from 1979 to 1990, was split between the minor leagues and then in Europe, mainly in the Swiss Nationalliga A. After his playing career Nethrey became a coach and manager in the Deutsche Eishockey Liga, working in those roles between 1993 and 2019.

Playing career 
Nethery was born in Toronto, Ontario, and raised in Burlington, Ontario. He attended Cornell University, playing for the Cornell Big Red, and midway through his college career he was selected by the New York Rangers, 131st overall, in the eighth round of the 1977 NHL amateur draft. The same year he was named to the ECAC Second All-Star team, and the following two seasons he was named to both the ECAC First All-Star Team and the NCAA East First All-American Team. He was also named ECAC Player of the Year in 1978.

Nethery still holds the Cornell records for assists and points in a season, as well as career assists and points. His scoring touch stayed with him as a professional player, and he averaged over a point per game in parts of three seasons with the New Haven Nighthawks and Springfield Indians of the American Hockey League (AHL).

Nethery played 41 National Hockey League games in two seasons, for the New York Rangers and Edmonton Oilers. After joining the Oilers in a trade for Eddie Mio, Nethery played only three more NHL games, despite putting up two points.

In 1982, Nethery left North America, signing with Duisburger SC in Germany.

He played dominantly in the minor leagues before signing a contract with HC Davos of the Swiss Nationalliga A. Nethery won two championships with Davos, and retired in 1988. In 186 regular season games with HC Davos he averaged 1.92 points per game.

Coaching and managing career 
Nethery was named the head coach of Davos for the 1990–91 season, and was fired midway through.  In 1993 he joined German hockey club Landshut as an assistant coach, and then became the head coach of Mannheim from 1994 to 1999, during which time his team won the league championship three times.  In 1999 he became the head coach of Cologne, as well as general manager in 2000, until January 2002.  During this time he also served as an assistant coach with Team Canada for the 2001 Deutschland Cup.  He joined the Frankfurt Lions as head coach on April 11, 2002, and was subsequently elevated to general manager on February 5, 2003, leading the team to its first championship.  He was hired as the GM of the DEG Metro Stars prior to the 2005–06 season. His contract, set to expire in 2008, was extended through 2012. Nethery and the Metro Stars parted ways by mutual consent in January 2012.

He then served as chief executive officer of Düsseldorf's rival Kölner Haie between February 2013 and October 2014.

In January 2015, Nethery was named team principal of German Oberliga side Füchse Duisburg and also took over head coaching duties beginning with the 2016-17 campaign. He was released on February 12, 2017, but returned to the Füchse team on May 1, 2018 as sporting director.

Personal 
Nethery and his wife Elizabeth have a daughter, Meredith. Meredith graduated from Cornell University in 2009.

Career statistics

Regular season and playoffs

Awards and honors

References

External links 

Lance Nethery's biography at Hockey Draft Central
Lance Nethery's biography at the New York Rangers website
Cornell hockey records

1957 births
Living people
AHCA Division I men's ice hockey All-Americans
Canadian expatriate ice hockey players in Switzerland
Canadian ice hockey centres
Cornell Big Red men's ice hockey players
Edmonton Oilers players
Füchse Duisburg players
HC Davos players
Hershey Bears players
New Haven Nighthawks players
New York Rangers draft picks
New York Rangers players
SC Herisau players
Sportspeople from Burlington, Ontario
Ice hockey people from Toronto
Springfield Indians players
Wichita Wind players